Sajid's Superstars is an Indian television talk show that aired  Colors TV, mainly featuring celebrities from Hindi or Bollywood cinema. Sajid Khan is the host of the show and its first season was aired in between July 2008 and October 2008.

Format of the show
The format of the talk show in Sajid's own words:

"First there is a basic chat round. Then there is 'How well do you know yourself?' round in which I will ask the guests about themselves, their films and colleagues and see how much they remember. These questions are not really personal, even the general public knows the answers… it's to see how much stars remember. Then there is a 'Stars' cross questions' round where in one star will question the star present on the show through video. In another round, the public tells the star what they like and dislike about him/her and may request the star to do something like sing or dance. Then I show the guest their worst and best scenes to date."

"If you are on my show, you have to be funny, so there is a 'Sit down comedy' round where stars show their funny side and I rate them through my laugh-o-meter. Lastly, there is a 'Scandal round' where the star has to choose from a 'kum, zyaada and a zabardast' scandalous question. Depending on the card they pick, I ask a question. So the show is well segmented."

References

External links
Sajid's Superstars - Official Website

Colors TV original programming
2008 Indian television series debuts
Indian television series